The Diamond Fleece is a 1992 Canadian made-for-television film directed by Al Waxman and starring Ben Cross, Kate Nelligan and Brian Dennehy. The film earned Kate Nelligan the 1993 Gemini Award for Best Performance by an Actress in a Leading Role in a Dramatic Program or Mini-Series.

Cast and characters

References

External links
 

Canadian drama television films
1992 television films
1992 films
English-language Canadian films
1990s Canadian films